The 15th Ariel Awards ceremony, organized by the Mexican Academy of Film Arts and Sciences (AMACC) took place on May 20, 1973, in Mexico City. During the ceremony, AMACC presented the Ariel Award in 14 categories honoring films released in 1972. El Castillo de la Pureza and Mecánica Nacional were the most nominated films, and also the most awarded with five wins each, including a tie for Best Picture, with Reed, México Insurgente. Canadian-Mexican cinematographer Alex Phillips received the Golden Ariel for his artistic career.

Winners and nominees
Winners are listed first and highlighted with boldface.

References

Ariel Awards ceremonies
1973 film awards
1973 in Mexico